Hebei Subdistrict is a subdistrict in Haizhou District, Fuxin, Liaoning province, China. , it has nine residential communities under its administration:
Hebei Community
Yucai Community
Qingnian Community
Hongqi Community
Xiyiyuan Community
Guxiangyuan Community
Xihuayuan Community
Sanyiba Community
Jiaoyu Community

See also 
 List of township-level divisions of Liaoning

References 

Township-level divisions of Liaoning
Fuxin